Michael Fish,  (born 27 April 1944 in Eastbourne, Sussex) is a British weather forecaster. From 1974 to 2004, he was a television presenter for BBC Weather.

Career
Educated at Eastbourne College and City University London, Fish was the longest-serving broadcast meteorologist on British television. He joined the Met Office in 1962 and started on BBC Radio in 1971, moving to the role on television in 1974.

Fish was awarded the MBE in 2004 for services to broadcasting. He was retired and made his final forecast on 6 October 2004 on the BBC Ten O'Clock News bulletin. In a specially extended report fellow forecaster Ian McCaskill paid tribute to Fish in stating that "Michael is the last of the true weatherman you will ever see. Michael can actually interpret the skies – he can do the weather forecast the hard way: the old way that people don't do any more, because nowadays most of the decisions are made by the computer."

That year he was also awarded the TRIC Award for TV Weather Presenter of the Year and The Sunday Times gave him the honour of "National Treasure".

Michael Fish also co-authored a book with Paul Hudson and Ian McCaskill called Storm Force: Britain's Wildest Weather, published in October 2007. He was awarded honorary degrees by City University London in 1996 and Exeter University in the summer of 2005.

More than eight years after retiring from the BBC national forecasts team, he made a return to regular forecasting, presenting a weekly weather forecast for Netweather.tv. He resumed forecasting on BBC South East Today, providing holiday cover for the regular forecaster and has also taken to acting. He is a patron of numerous organisations and charities. He has since retired from presenting his weekly forecast on Netweather.tv as announced on the 24 December 2021.

Hurricane controversy
A few hours before the Great Storm of 1987 broke, on 15 October 1987, he said during a forecast: "Earlier on today, apparently, a woman rang the BBC and said she heard there was a hurricane on the way. Well, if you're watching, don't worry, there isn't!".  The storm was the worst to hit South East England for three centuries, causing record damage and killing 19 people.

In later years, Fish claimed that he had been referring to that year's Atlantic Hurricane Floyd affecting the Florida Keys at the time, in a link to a news story in the BBC One O'Clock News that preceded the weather bulletin. But he did not mention Florida in his forecast, which was made amid widespread worries about a coming storm: that morning, the Surrey Mirror had warned of "furious gales", so both his caller and his viewers likely believed he was referring to Britain. Fish did go on to warn of high winds for the UK, although the storm that actually occurred was far stronger than he had predicted, albeit technically not a hurricane. 15 years later he commented that if he were given a penny for every mention of that forecast, he would be a millionaire. In 2012, a clip of the bulletin was shown as part of a video montage in the London 2012 Summer Olympics opening ceremony.

In reaction to the controversy, the term "the Michael Fish effect" has been coined, whereby British weathermen are now inclined to predict "a worst-case scenario in order to avoid being caught out". The term "Michael Fish moment" is applied to public forecasts, on any topic, which turn out to be embarrassingly wrong.

Fish said in a BBC interview that there was actually no woman caller who phoned in to the BBC regarding the storm, although over the years many have claimed to be her. It was in fact a white lie he made up himself, as a colleague in the studio (presumably a BBC employee, although Fish himself technically worked for the Met Office as a civil servant) told him his mother in Wales was going to Florida and mentioned she had heard there was a storm coming, so he thought it would be a good opening line to start the forecast with, and said "Earlier on today, apparently, a woman rang the BBC...".

Personality and popular culture
Much ahead of his colleague, John Kettley, Fish had a record dedicated to him in 1985 by the punk group Rachel and Nicki called "I wish, I wish, he was like Michael Fish". This was featured on Wogan.
 
In 2012, Fish worked with an eco fashion company to coordinate a Base jump from a block of flats in central London to raise awareness of climate change.

In 2014, Fish appeared in a music video for the song 'Weatherman' by Randolph's Leap (band).

In 2017 Fish partnered with Fullers Brewery for a campaign called #Whenitrainsitpours which gave Twitter followers a free pint of London Pride each time it rained in London.

Fish lives in Twickenham, south western Greater London.

Other television appearances
Fish appeared on dozens of other television programmes, ranging from scientific broadcasts to comedy shows and quizzes. He was on BBC2's game show Identity on 3 September 2007 as a TV weather forecaster. On 14 October 2007, he appeared on Radio 4's Sunday news review Broadcasting House as a guest newspaper reviewer and delivered the weather forecast at the end of the programme.

To commemorate the 20th anniversary of the Great Storm, Fish returned to deliver the weather forecast on the BBC's One O'Clock and Six O'Clock news on 15 October 2007.

Fish mentioned briefly on Big Brother's Bit on the Side on 16 August 2018 as the series Celebrity Big Brother 22 is named Eye of the Storm. On 18 July 2022, Fish appeared live in the studio on BBC2s Newsnight for a discussion about the heatwave implications with Presenter Kirsty Wark. Fish repeated he had been advocating more use of Nuclear Energy since the 1970s and hadn't changed his view.

St Jude storm
The St Jude storm, also known as Storm Christian, was a severe European wind storm that struck north western Europe on 27 October 2013. Michael Fish was widely quoted, this time telling the public that people should delay going into work if hurricane-force winds hit their area.

References

External links

Walking into the sunset
 Michael Fish at Knight Ayton Management

The famous broadcast, 1987
The weekly netweather.tv forecast

1944 births
Alumni of City, University of London
BBC weather forecasters
English meteorologists
Living people
Members of the Order of the British Empire
People educated at Eastbourne College
People from Eastbourne